Bakrak (Baqraq) is a rural locality (a village) in Zilim-Karanovsky Selsoviet, Gafuriysky District, Bashkortostan, Russia. The population was 124 as of 2010. There are 3 streets.

Geography 
Bakrak is located 51 km north of Krasnousolsky (the district's administrative centre) by road. Zilim-Karanovo is the nearest rural locality.

References 

Rural localities in Gafuriysky District